was a city that existed from January 15, 1952, to February 1967 in Osaka Prefecture, Japan.

The city was formed by merger of two towns (Tatetsu and Tamagawa) and three villages (Akata, Minogō and Wakae).

In 1967, it merged with the cities of Fuse and Hiraoka and became the city of Higashiōsaka.

The city was home to a KDD/NHK shortwave transmitter site that saw its heyday during World War II and closed in the 1960s. More recently it is rumored to be used as a microwave tower site. The site was used in conjunction with Yamata and Nazaki.

Dissolved municipalities of Osaka Prefecture